Peter A. Juley (1862 - January 13, 1937) was a German-born American photographer. He emigrated to the United States at age 26 in 1888 and founded a studio in Cold Spring, New York in 1896. He worked for several publications, including Harper's Weekly, and he photographed President Theodore Roosevelt. He also became the official photographer of the National Academy of Design and the New York Public Library. After his son Paul joined him in New York City in 1907, his firm changed its name to Peter A. Juley and Son, and it "became the largest and most respected fine-art photography studio in New York."

Gallery

References

1862 births
1937 deaths
People from Rhineland-Palatinate
People from Cold Spring, New York
German emigrants to the United States
Photographers from New York City
19th-century American photographers
20th-century American photographers